Abacetus aberrans is a species of ground beetle in the subfamily Pterostichinae. It was described by Straneo in 1943 and is found in Tanzania, Africa.

References

Endemic fauna of Tanzania
aberrans
Beetles described in 1943
Insects of East Africa